Showgirls 2: Penny's from Heaven is a 2011 American erotic drama film written, produced, edited and directed by Rena Riffel. A sequel to Paul Verhoeven's Showgirls (1995), the film stars Riffel, reprising her role as stripper Penny Slot / Helga, alongside Glenn Plummer, Peter Stickles, Greg Travis, Shelley Michelle, Ford Austin, Jade Paris and Andrew Štefánik. The plot follows Penny as she relocates to Los Angeles to pursue her dream of becoming a dancer on a hit television show. 

An early script and Kickstarter fundraising campaign for the project was titled Showgirl, and the script was originally titled Stardancer. The film was released in theatres at midnight film showings, art house theatres, film festivals, and charity non-profit organizations, and also received worldwide distribution on DVD and VOD.

Premise
The plot heavily echoes that of the original film, focusing on showgirl Penny Slot (Riffel) as she attempts to rise to fame as a dancer.

Cast
 Rena Riffel as Penny Slot / Helga
 Glenn Plummer as Jimmy Smith 
 Greg Travis as Phil
 Dewey Weber as Jeffrey
 Peter Stickles as Godhardt Brandt
 Ford Austin as Mr. Von Brausen
 Blanca Blanco as Mrs. Von Brausen
 Hoyt Richards as Detective John Clayburn
 Marc Wasserman as Daryl Smith, Hollywood Producer
 Dylan Vox as Rocco
 Steve Williams as Franky
 Ted Alderman as Daryl
 Chae Amando as Domonique
 Nomi Madness as Sebastian 
 Clinton H. Wallace as Sammy Davis 
 MYC Agnew as Vladamir Von Der Hoertberg
 Brad Kilmer as Ceasar Stardust
 Amber Dawn Lee as Dominique, The Executive
 Maria Marini as Madame Sarah Bright
 Bradley Laise as Mister Rainbow
 Benjamin Ramirez as Magnolia Silver
 Lotti Pharriss Knowles as Gladys, Homeless Showgirl
 John V. Knowles as Diggs, Homeless Showboy
 Chris Saranchock as Al, Strip Club Boss
 Brooke Mason as Sapphire, The Secretary
 Shelley Michelle as Katya Vardiova
 Paula Labaredes as Maria Strauss
 Andrew Štefánik as 'Sexy Boy'
 Elissa Dowling as 'Ultra Vixen'
 Lenora Claire as 'Emerald'
 Jade Paris as Karen
 DeeDee Bigelow as Gloria
 Erin Affourtit as Tammy
 Sherill Turner as 'Sugar'
 Karen Agnes as 'Cupcake'
 Christa Bormann as Jenny
 Holly Fraser as 'Uber-Nanna'
 Ayesha Orange as Uta
 Kristin Campbell-Taylor as Gerda
 Christy Cody as Bertha
 Julia Sandberg Hansson as Julia, The Mask Dancer

References

External links

Showgirls 2: Penny's from Heaven at AllMovie
''

2011 direct-to-video films
2011 films
American thriller films
2010s English-language films
Direct-to-video sequel films
Films about striptease
American satirical films
Unofficial sequel films
2010s thriller films
Films about interracial romance
2010s American films